Christopher David Tregaskis (born 5 January 1965) is a former New Zealand rugby union player. A lock, Tregaskis represented Wellington and Marlborough at domestic level. Tragaskis was known as an imposing physical specimen, and was a member of the New Zealand national side, the All Blacks, on the 1991 tour of Argentina. He played four games for the All Blacks but did not play any test matches.

References

1965 births
Living people
Rugby union players from Lower Hutt
People educated at Scots College, Wellington
Wellington rugby union players
Rugby union locks
New Zealand rugby union players
New Zealand international rugby union players